Yunlin County (Mandarin pinyin: Yúnlín Xiàn; Taigi POJ: Hûn-lîm-koān; Hakka PFS: Yùn-lìm-yen) is a county in western Taiwan. Yunlin County borders the Taiwan Strait to the west, Nantou County to the east, Changhua County to the north at the Zhuoshui River, and Chiayi County to the south at the Beigang River. Yunlin is part of the Chianan Plain, a flat land known for its agriculture. Agricultural products of Yunlin County include pomelo, tea leaves, suan cai, papaya and muskmelon. Yunlin's rivers give it potential for hydroelectricity. Douliu is the largest and capital city of Yunlin. It is the only county on the main island of Taiwan where no city with the same name exists. Yunlin is one of the least developed counties on the West coast, and suffers from emigration.

History

Dutch Formosa
During the Dutch Formosa era, Ponkan (modern-day Beigang) was an important coastal castle.

Qing Dynasty
Yunlin County was established during the Qing Dynasty. Liu Mingchuan was in charge of Taiwan, which had been divided into three counties since 1683, Yunlin being part of Zhuluo County. Mountains made transportation and communication between bordering counties (Changhua and Chiayi) difficult, so Liu suggested a new county, called Yunlin, for easier management. In 1887, Yunlin became one of the four counties of the new Taiwan Prefecture.

Empire of Japan
During Japanese rule, Yunlin (as Unrin) County was again abolished due to the resistance from the local people and combined with Tainan Prefecture. However,  continued to be an important city of central Taiwan.

Republic of China
The Yunlin area remained under Tainan County after the handover of Taiwan from Japan to the Republic of China on 25 October 1945. On 16 August 1950, Yunlin County was separated from Tainan County, with Douliu Township as the county seat. On 25 December 1981, Douliu Township was upgraded to a county-administered city. Yunlin is the only county on Taiwan island without a city of the same name.

Geography
Yunlin County is located in the central-south portion of western Taiwan and is at the northern tip of the Chianan Plain. The county is bordered by Nantou County to the east, the Taiwan Strait to the west, Chiayi County to the south separated by the Beigang River, and Changhua County to the north separated by the Zhuoshui River.

Geology
Around 80% of Yunlin County are plains and the other 10% are hills. Generally the county is covered with high green space. In 2015, the county experienced 75% of Taiwan's total land subsidence, over an area of  due to its groundwater overuse.

Climate
The weather in the county is tropical, with an annual average temperature of 22.6 °C and an average annual rainfall of 1,028.9 mm.

Administration

Yunlin County is divided into 1 city, 5 urban townships and 14 rural townships. Douliu City is the county seat and home to the Yunlin County Government and the Yunlin County Council. Chang Li-shan of the Kuomintang is the incumbent Magistrate of Yunlin County.

Color indicates the statutory language status of Hakka in the respective subdivisions.

Politics
Yunlin County elected  two Democratic Progressive Party legislators to the Legislative Yuan during the 2020 legislative election, represented by Liu Chien-kuo and Su Chih-fen. The majority seats of Yunlin County Council is independent but headed by speaker Shen Tsung-lung of the Kuomintang.

Demographics and Culture

Cultural activities in the county is regulated by the Bureau of Cultural Affairs of the Yunlin County Government, which holds exhibitions, speeches, performances and studies to promote the arts and related activities.

Sports

The county government promotes many sports. The Douliu Baseball Stadium and Yunlin County Stadium are two of the international-level sports facilities in the county.

The first for-all-people games were held in Yunlin County in 2000. The county also hosted the 2005 National Games. In the 2011 National Games at Changhua, Yunlin ranked 11th out of the 22 counties and cities of Taiwan, with 10 gold, 8 silver and 8 bronze medals.

Recent major sporting events held by Yunlin include:
 2007 Baseball World Cup (co-hosted with Taipei, New Taipei, and Taichung)
 2010 Intercontinental Cup (co-hosted with Taichung)
 2013 18U Baseball World Cup (co-hosted with Taichung)
 2015 WBSC Premier12 (co-hosted with Taipei, Taoyuan, and Taichung)
 2019 Asian Baseball Championship (co-hosted with Taichung)
 2022 U-23 Baseball World Cup (co-hosted with Taipei and Taichung)

Economy

Yunlin County's economy relies mainly on agricultural production, including fresh-water fisheries, although there are also industrial parks. As of 2006, the land use for agriculture, forestry and fishery production accounts about 66.45% of its area. As of July 2015, the county had a total debt of NT$64.8 billion. Monthly, the county government spend NT$600 million for staffs salary and another NT$600 million for retirement funds.

Agriculture
Farmlands accounts for around 68% of Yunlin County's area. Good weather and fertile lands allows various seasonal crops. Among the agricultural products are coffee, hard clams, horseshoe calms, Taiwan tilapia, shaddock, soy sauce, pickled cabbage, peanuts and sesame oil.

Fishery
Yunlin County boasts excellent fishing grounds along its coastline. There are several leading fishing ports, at Boziliao, Santiaolun, Taixi, Taizicun, and Jinhu. Several institutions were established in the county to help the development of the county's fishing industries: the Taixi Experimental Fishing Grounds, the Seawater Fish Farming Research Center, the Aquaculture Experimental Station, and the Agriculture Council.

Livestock
Livestock farming includes pigs, cows, chickens, geese and ducks. The county government has been aggressively helping the dairy farmers to upgrade their feeding techniques, and also set up modern meat-packing facilities.

Tourism
The county government plans to develop the tourism and recreational industries within the county, such as by establishing a holiday fish market at the Boziliao Fishing Port in the hopes of attracting more visitors.

Food

Beigang: Duck meat soup is the most famous breakfast in Begiang.

Gukeng: Bucket Chicken

Kouhu: Mullet roe, eel

Lunbei: Meatballs

Shuilin: Sweet potatoes

Sihu: Eel Noodles

The eel fried noodles have about 10 slices of eel. The noodles are soft but strong.

Tounan: Fried buns

Tuku: Angelica Duck Noodles, a traditional tonic snack. The red noodles are more fragrant the more you chew.

Xiluo: Carrot cake

The filling of the cake is unlike ordinary cakes. The taste is dense and has pieces and the aroma of carrots. It is a common place for gatherings.

Education

The county is home to four universities: the China Medical University Beigang Campus, the National Formosa University, the National Yunlin University of Science and Technology and the TransWorld University. There are 8 public senior high schools, 9 private high schools, 32 junior high schools and 156 elementary schools, as well as the National Yunlin Special Education School.

To promote lifelong learning, the Yunlin County Government established a community university in 2001 with 6 learning centers to offer county residents more opportunities.
Senior High Schools

Public Schools

National Beigang Agricultural & Industrial Vocational Senior High School

National Beigang Senior High School

National Huwei Agricultural & Industrial Vocational Senior High School

National Huwei Senior High School

National Tou-liu School Of Home Economic & Commerce

National Tou-liu Senior High School	

National Tuku School Of Home Economic & Commerce

Yunlin County Mailiao High School

Yunlin County Tounan Senior High School

Private Schools

Bliss And Wisdom Senior High School

Da-cheng Vocational High School

Dader Industrial And Commercial Vocational High School

Perpetual Help High School

Ren High School

Sacred Hearts High School

St.Vincent High School

Victoria Academy

Yang-tze High School

Yi-feng Senior High School

Energy

Power generations
Yunlin County houses one power plant, the Mailiao Power Plant, in Mailiao Township. Commissioned in July 1999, it has a capacity of 4,200 MW and is the third largest coal-fired power plant in Taiwan.

Water supply
Currently, most of the county residence use groundwater as their water supply. However, in 2016 the Hushan Dam was opened in Douliu City in which its reservoir will soon supply the water needs for the county residence.

Tourist attractions

Historical buildings
Historical buildings in the county include the House of Citizen-Memorial Hall of Attendance, Jhen Wen Academy, Erlun Story House and Xiluo Theater.

Ma Min Shan Park Labyrinth

The first temple theme park in Taiwan with the largest area, the park occupies a large area, full of unique mountains and rocks. It features a beautiful courtyard landscape of high mountain and stone forests, matched with beautiful surroundings. There are a total of 73 characteristic landscapes in the area. The park includes the steep and eye-catching Rainbow Bridge. You can climb up to a panoramic view of the park.

Xiluo Bridge

Xiluo Bridge, a highway bridge in Taiwan, it was called Zhuoshuixi Bridge during the Japanese Occupation. It connects Yunlin County and Changhua County, and straddles the lower reaches of Zhuoshui River. It is designed with a Warren-style truss bridge. When it was completed in 1952, the Xiluo Bridge was the second longest bridge in the world after the Golden Gate Bridge in San Francisco in the United States.  At that time, it was known as the "Far East First Bridge."

Scenic spot
 Caoling is a popular mountain scenic spot in Yunlin County.
Yunling Hill is located at the intersection of three counties: Yunlin, Chiayi County, and Nantou County. It is a new mountain scenic spot, with an altitude of about 1,650 meters, offering a great view of sunrise, sunset and the sea of clouds.
 Green Tunnel Park

It is a long and narrow roadside park with a brick walking/biking path lined with mango trees. Next to the tunnel, there was a small sugar train that ran along the road. Its tracks, stations, and carriages were quite unique. Therefore, the Gukeng Township Government plans to combine its landscape with a small train and plan it as a place for people to get married and as a cultural landscape park.

Temples
Prominent Temples in the county include;
 Beigang Chaotian Temple: one of the most important Mazu temples in Taiwan and known for its magnificent temple architecture, visited by more than a million pilgrims every year
 Beigang Wude Temple (北港武德宮): one of the largest temple dedicated to Xuan Tan Zhen Jun (玄壇真君), Martial God of Wealth
 Xiluo Guangfu Temple: prominent Mazu temple in Xiluo township
 Xiluo Fuxing Temple (西螺福興宮)： prominent Mazu temple in Xiluo township, have an annual  procession during Mazu's Birthday
 Yong'an Temple: a popular temple dedicated to the Deity known as Kai Zhang Sheng Wang (開漳聖王)

Museums and cultural centers
Yunlin County is home to several museums and cultural centers, such as the Beigang Cultural Center, Farming and Irrigation Artifacts Museum, Honey Museum, Museum of Beigang Story, Soy Sauce Brewing Museum, Yunlin Hand Puppet Museum, Yunlin Story House and Zhaoan Hakka Cultural Hall.

Cheng Lin Agarwood Forest Museum

Chenglin Agarwood Forest Museum is located in Huwei Town, covering an area of about 5.8 hectares. It was the first largest agarwood forest park in the county. It has a Japanese Zen-style like Kenroku Garden and a simple style of ecological landscape pond. The garden is covered with more than 80 species of trees for viewing. The venue has a professional guided introduction and many thousand-year-old cypress artworks, as well as Chenglin's exclusive collection of the world's largest 3,000-year-old sacred wood.

Honey Museum

Bee Story House is located beside the green tunnel of Gukeng. You can see a large turf once you enter the park. There is a very eye-catching big bee on the roof of the pavilion. On both sides of the door are bees to greet visitors. The theme is an exhibition of honey, bees and honey tasting. Children can play on the grass.

Festivals
Festivals, such as the Beigang International Music Festival, are regularly held in the county.

Theme parks
The Janfusun Fancyworld is a theme park in the county.

Chan Chau Ku is a dairy farm. Although there were quite a few dairy farmers in the area, there was no way for tourists to visit the parks. So the founder decided to build a leisure farm and open the park for free to encourage everyone to get close to nature.

Nature
Yunlin County houses the Chenglong Wetlands, Erlun Sports Park, Penglai Waterfall and Ten Thousand Year Gorge.

Hushan Reservoir

Hushan Reservoir is located in Douliu City and Gukeng Township, 10 kilometers southeast of Douliu City. Due to the small catchment area, the Tongtou River Barrage was built in Qingshui Creek. Water was diverted to supplement the water source.

Penglai Waterfall

Penglai Waterfall is located in Penny's Water Creek Valley on the east side of the Caoling settlement in Gukeng Township. It belongs to the Zhuoshui River Basin. The altitude of the waterfall is about 920 meters, and the drop is about 70 meters. It is listed as one of the ten scenic spots in Caoling.

Transportation

Rail
Taiwan High Speed Rail Yunlin Station is located at Huwei Township. Taiwan Railways Administration has stations at Linnei, Shiliu, Douliu, Dounan and Shigui.

Roads
National Highway No. 1 and No. 3 pass through Yunlin County. Famous bridges in the county are the Xiluo Bridge, connecting the county to the neighboring Changhua County, and the Beigang Tourist Bridge, connecting the county to the neighboring Chiayi County.

Air
Yunlin County does not have any airport. The nearest airport is the Chiayi Airport located in neighboring Chiayi County.

Relative location

See also
 List of Taiwanese superlatives

References

External links

Yunlin County Government Website